Peter Kramer (born 1933 in Quedlinburg) is a German physicist.

Personal life 

Kramer studied physics at the University of Münster, the University of Tübingen, the University of Bristol and the University of Marburg.  He received his PhD in 1964 in Marburg and in 1968 his Habilitation
in Tübingen. He was a postdoc at the UNAM in Mexico City, where he collaborated with Marcos Moshinsky.
He was a professor at the Institute for Theoretical Physics in Tübingen from 1970 until 1998 when he retired. He has also served as a Dean and a Vice President at the University of Tübingen.  Kramer married in 1962 and has two children.

Scientific work 

Kramer's work is concerned with applications of groups and representations in mathematical physics. His early work was in nuclear physics. In the early eighties he and his student Roberto Neri developed a mathematical model for quasiperiodic tesselations of three-dimensional space.  Their paper was submitted in 1983 and published in 1984, the same year that Dan Shechtman and his co-workers announced the experimental discovery of an alloy with icosahedral quasi-crystalline structure. Shechtman was awarded the 2011 Nobel Prize in chemistry for his work.

More recently, Kramer has become interested in cosmology and three-dimensional space forms. His scientific œuvre contains more than 200 publications.

Publications 

 P. Kramer, G. John and D. Schenzle: Group Theory and the Interaction of Composite Nucleon Systems. Vieweg, Braunschweig 1981
 P. Kramer and M. Saraceno: Geometry of the Time-dependent Variational Principle in Quantum Mechanics. Lecture Notes in Physics 140, Springer, Berlin 1981
 P. Kramer and R. Neri: On periodic and non-periodic space fillings of Em obtained by projection. In: Acta Crystallogr. A 40, 1984, 580-587 
 P. Kramer and A. Mackay: Crystallography: Some answers but more questions. In: Nature 316, 1985, 17-18 
 P. Kramer: Gateways towards quasicrystals. 2010 arXiv:1101.0061v1
 P. Kramer: Platonic topology and CMB fluctuations: homotopy, anisotropy and multipole selection rules. In: Class. Quantum Grav. 27, 2010,

References

External links 
 Homepage of Peter Kramer at the University of Tübingen

20th-century  German physicists
21st-century  German physicists
1933 births
Living people
People from Quedlinburg
Academic staff of the University of Tübingen